Jonas Eidevall (born 28 January 1983) is a Swedish professional football coach who is the head coach of FA WSL club Arsenal. He previously served as head coach of Swedish club FC Rosengård from 2013 to 2014 and from 2018 to 2021, winning three Damallsvenskan titles and one Svenska Cupen Damer championship.

Career 
Eidevall began his coaching career at the age of 23, as an assistant coach for Division 2 side Lunds BK in Skåne. After three and a half years as an assistant, he was named the club's coach. In 2009, he led the club to a first place finish in Division 2 and promotion to Ettan Fotboll.

In 2012, he left Lund to join Damallsvenskan side FC Rosengård as an assistant manager. In 2013, he took over as Rosengård's head coach. He led the side to back-to-back first place finishes in 2013 and 2014.

He left Rosengård in 2016 to join Superettan side Helsingborgs IF as an assistant manager, serving under Henrik Larsson.

After one year at Helsingborgs, he returned to Rosengård. He led the club to a Svenska Cupen Damer victory in 2018 and another league title in 2019. In 2019, he also led Rosengård to the Champions League quarter-finals.

In June 2021, he was named head coach for FA WSL side Arsenal, replacing Joe Montemurro.

Coaching style 
Eidevall has described his coaching style as a "high-paced possession game."

Managerial statistics

Honours
FC Rosengård
Damallsvenskan: 2013, 2014, 2019
Swedish Cup: 2017–18 
Arsenal
FA Women's League Cup: 2022–23

References

1983 births
Living people
Swedish football managers
Swedish expatriate football managers
Arsenal W.F.C. managers
FC Rosengård managers
Women's Super League managers
People from Borås
Sportspeople from Västra Götaland County